You're Killing Me Susana is a 2016 Mexican romantic comedy-drama film directed by Roberto Sneider. The film tells about the self-assured handsome Eligio, who is trying to get his wife back, who for some reason always leaves him, when he thinks everything is fine.

Cast 
 Gael García Bernal – Eligio
 Verónica Echegui – Susana
 Ashley Hinshaw – Irene 
 Jadyn Wong – Altagracia
 Björn Hlynur Haraldsson – Slawomir
 Adam Hurtig – Bryan
 Daniel Giménez Cacho – Editor

References

External links 

2016 films
2010s Spanish-language films
2016 romantic comedy-drama films
Mexican comedy-drama films
2010s Mexican films

Mexican romantic comedy-drama films